The 1909 Australasian Championships was a tennis tournament that took place on outdoor grass courts at Perth Zoo, Perth, Australia from 16 October to 25 October 1909. It was the fifth edition of the Australasian Championships (now known as the Australian Open), the first held in Perth and the third Grand Slam tournament of the year. Anthony Wilding won the singles title, his second after 1906.

Finals

Singles

 Anthony Wilding defeated  Ernie Parker 6–1, 7–5, 6–2

Doubles
 J. P. Keane /  Ernie Parker defeated  Tom Crooks /  Anthony Wilding 1–6, 6–1, 6–1, 9–7

References

External links
 Australian Open official website

 
1909
November 1909 sports events
1909 in Australian tennis
1909 in New Zealand sport